Corie Andrews (born 20 September 1997) is an English professional footballer who plays as a forward for National League club Wealdstone.

Career
Born in London, Andrews began his career with Crystal Palace, turning professional with them at the age of 17. He spent time on loan with Margate and Kingstonian. He was released by Crystal Palace at the end of the 2016–17 season.

He spent the 2019–20 season with Whyteleafe, making 36 competitive appearances.

He signed permanently for Kingstonian in 2020, making 12 competitive appearances for them, before returning to professional football with AFC Wimbledon in January 2021. He moved on loan to Aldershot Town in July 2021, and to Colchester United in January 2022.

Having been released by AFC Wimbledon at the end of the 2021–22 season, Andrews joined National League club Torquay United in July 2022.

Andrews joined National League club Wealdstone in January 2023.

References

1997 births
Living people
English footballers
Association football forwards
National League (English football) players
English Football League players
Isthmian League players
Crystal Palace F.C. players
Margate F.C. players
Kingstonian F.C. players
Whyteleafe F.C. players
AFC Wimbledon players
Aldershot Town F.C. players
Colchester United F.C. players
Torquay United F.C. players
Wealdstone F.C. players